Oliver Bekker (born 11 December 1984) is a South African professional golfer.

Professional career
Bekker plays on the Sunshine Tour where he has won seven times. He won the 2011 Northern Cape Classic, the 2012 Dimension Data Pro-Am, the 2013 Telkom PGA Pro-Am and the 2016 Sun City Challenge. He won three times in 2017, the Zambia Sugar Open, the Lombard Insurance Classic, and the Sun Wild Coast Sun Challenge.

In April 2021, Bekker lost in a four-man playoff at the Limpopo Championship. In December, he finished second in the SA Open Championship; one shot behind Daniel van Tonder. At the end of the season he graduated to the European Tour for 2022 via the Challenge Tour rankings.

In May 2022, Bekker broke into the top 100 of the Official World Golf Ranking for the first time after losing out in a playoff for the Catalunya Championship. In June 2022, he played in the inaugural LIV Golf Invitational Series event. Along with several other players, he was subsequently fined by the European Tour and suspended from three PGA Tour co-sanctioned events.

In February 2023, Bekker won the Dimension Data Pro-Am for the second time in his career. The event was co-sanctioned between the Challenge Tour and the Sunshine Tour.

Professional wins (8)

Sunshine Tour wins (8)

1Co-sanctioned by the Challenge Tour

Sunshine Tour playoff record (1–1)

Challenge Tour wins (1)

1Co-sanctioned by the Sunshine Tour

Challenge Tour playoff record (0–1)

Playoff record
European Tour playoff record (0–1)

Results in major championships
Results not in chronological order in 2020.

CUT = missed the halfway cut
NT = No tournament due to COVID-19 pandemic

Results in World Golf Championships

"T" = Tied

See also
2021 Challenge Tour graduates

References

External links

South African male golfers
Lamar Cardinals golfers
European Tour golfers
Sunshine Tour golfers
LIV Golf players
Sportspeople from Pretoria
People from Stellenbosch
White South African people
1984 births
Living people